Streptomyces lomondensis is a bacterium species from the genus of Streptomyces which has been isolated from soil. Streptomyces lomondensis produces the antibiotic lomofungin.

Further reading

See also 
 List of Streptomyces species

References

External links
Type strain of Streptomyces lomondensis at BacDive -  the Bacterial Diversity Metadatabase

lomondensis
Bacteria described in 1969